Proterochampsidae is a family of proterochampsian archosauriforms. Proterochampsids may have filled an ecological niche similar to modern crocodiles, and had a general crocodile-like appearance. They lived in what is now South America in the Middle and Late Triassic.

Description
Proterochampsids have long, crocodile-like skulls. The posterior portion of the skull is wide while the snout is very narrow. Most proterochampsids also have downturned snouts. Like many early archosauriforms, they also have dermal armour.

Proterochampsids have small holes called dorsal fenestrae at the top of their skulls. Unlike other early archosauromorphs, they do not have a parietal foramin, which in many reptiles holds a parietal eye. The postorbital bones behind the eye sockets have thick, jagged crests. As another diagnostic feature of the group, the holes that allow the passage of the internal carotid artery through the braincase open at the sides of a bony projection called the basipterygoid process. Proterochampsids are primitive in that they have simple plate-like pelvises, but they lack small bones in the vertebra called intercentra that are common in earlier reptiles.

As in most archosaurs, distinguishing features can be seen in the shape of the ankle bones. A projection on the calcaneum bone called the calcaneal tuber is narrow and positioned downward relative to other lateral projections on the bone. The calcaneum also has a facet that attaches to both the fibula bone of the leg and another tarsal, or ankle bone. A hemicylindrical facet on the calcaneum attaches to another bone in the ankle called the astragalus. The astragalus has facets that attach to the tibia and fibula that are adjacent to each other.

Classification
Proterochampsidae was named in 1966 by A.S. Romer in his book Vertebrate Paleontology, 3rd edition. Members such as Proterochampsa and Cerritosaurus had been known for several decades prior to the family's creation. Proterochampsids were originally thought to be close relatives of crocodilians based on their similar appearance. In the following years, proterochampsids were frequently associated with Proterosuchia, another group of long-snouted Triassic archosauriforms. As phylogenetic studies became more common in the 1980s and 1990s, proterochampsids were found to be a distinct group closely related to true archosaurs. Recent studies have placed Proterochampsidae as either the sister taxon of Archosauria (the closest relatives of archosaurs), or the sister taxon of Archosauria and Euparkeria. In a 2011 study, the unusual Late Triassic archosauriform Doswellia has been placed as the closest relative of proterochampsids. Because doswelliids are more closely related to proterochampsids than to any other archosauriform, the two groups form their own clade.

Seven species have been assigned to Proterochampsidae: Cerritosaurus binsfeldi, Chanaresuchus bonapartei, Gualosuchus reigi, Rhadinosuchus gracilis, Tropidosuchus romeri, Proterochampsa barrionuevoi, and Proterochampsa nodosa. P. nodosa was assigned to its own genus Barberenachampsa in 2000, but it is generally still considered to be a species of Proterochampsa. Modern studies place Proterochampsids in a larger group called Proterochampsia. Under the classification of Kischlat and Schultz (1999), Cerritosaurus, Proterochampsa, and Tropidosuchus are basal forms, while Chanaresuchus, Gualosuchus, and Rhadinosuchus form the family Rhadinosuchidae. However, more recent studies reduce Rhadinosuchidae to a subfamily level as Rhadinosuchinae to be placed within Proterochampsidae and include advanced proterochampsid, e.g. Chanaresuchus and Rhadinosuchus. Below is a cladogram following the phylogenetic analysis of Ezcurra (2016) that recovered Doswelliidae as the sister taxon of Proterochampsidae (within Proterochampsia). Proterochampsia was found to be the sister taxon of Archosauria, whose living representatives consist of birds and crocodilians.

Genera

Sources 
 A. S. Romer. 1966. Vertebrate Paleontology, 3rd edition. University of Chicago Press, Chicago 1-468 [M. Uhen/M. Uhen/M. Carrano]

Proterochampsians
Prehistoric reptile families
Triassic reptiles of South America
Ladinian first appearances
Norian extinctions
Taxa named by Alfred Romer